Milad Soleiman Fallah (born September 15, 1986) is an Iranian footballer who plays for Paykan in the Azadegan League.

Club career
Soleiman Fallah joined Saba F.C. in 2011.

 Assist Goals

References

1986 births
Living people
Saba players
Esteghlal F.C. players
Iranian footballers
Association football forwards
People from Karaj
21st-century Iranian people